Sci-Fi on the Rock is an annual science fiction, fantasy and horror festival held in St. John's, Newfoundland, Canada. It was founded by Darren Hann and Melanie Collins in mid-to-late 2006, and held its first festival in 2007. Since its first year, Sci-Fi on the Rock has been a completely volunteer organized non-profit event.

History 

It began in 2007 at the Hotel Mount Pearl, moving on to be housed in the Holiday Inn in St. John's as of April 2008. The convention made another move in 2016 to the Sheraton Hotel Newfoundland. The festival has had a number a notable guests both from Newfoundland and beyond, including science-fiction author Kenneth Tam (Defense Command, His Majesty's New World), comic-book artist Paul Tucker (The Underworld Railroad, Google John Smith), actor Brian Downey (Lexx, Millennium), actor Jeremy Bulloch (The Empire Strikes Back, Octopussy), author William Meikle (The Midnight Eye series), horror author Matthew LeDrew (Black Womb, Roulette) and author Shannon Patrick Sullivan (The Dying Days).

First Festival 

Sci-Fi on the Rock's first festival was held on April 1, 2007 at the Hotel Mount Pearl (formerly Chateau Park) in Mount Pearl, Newfoundland. It featured special guest authors Kenneth Tam and Shannon Patrick Sullivan, and local business/fangroup, Vader Party. As well as featuring special guests, the festival featured workshops throughout the day including the popular "Lightsaber Techniques", "Basic Horror Make-Up for Film and Television" and "Costume Designing". In addition, there were a number of sales-and-display tables, and a number of competitions such as Video Games, Model Building, Costume Contest, and others. Sci-Fi on the Rock also featured a canteen with Sci-Fi related food (i.e.: "The Kirk Burger").

Having been planned and put off within only a few months, and with little publicity, Sci-Fi on the Rock's first festival was a surprise success with almost 500 people attending, and was covered in many local media pages, as well as internet sites.

Sci-Fi on the Rock II 

As a result of the success of the first festival, Sci-Fi on the Rock organizers Darren Hann and Melanie Collins, as well as the now-larger organizing committee decided that the festival should be held again the following year and should be bigger. Around the summer of 2007, planning for Sci-Fi on the Rock II would commence.

The first change was time and place. It was increased from a one-day to a full weekend event, and was held in a larger venue. Sci-Fi on the Rock II was held at the Holiday Inn hotel in St. John's, on Saturday, April 19 and Sunday, April 20, 2008. As a kick-off to the festival, author Kenneth Tam was invited back as a special guest, and launched the first book in his new series The Grasslands on the evening before the festival. Other changes included the amount of publicity the festival received, and the structure of different competitions.
 
The list of special guests grew from three to seven, with Kenneth Tam and Vader Party returning for their second year, and the addition of authors Matthew LeDrew and Willie Meikle, comic-book artist Paul Tucker of Viper Comics, as well as the appearance of Celebrity Special Guests, actors Jeremy Bulloch, who notably played the bounty hunter Boba Fett from the Star Wars Franchise, and Brian Downey, who is perhaps best known for his role of Stanley Tweedle from Lexx: The Series.

Like the year before, Sci-Fi on the Rock II was met with positive reviews and overall success. In addition to more media coverage, both before and after the festival, the attendance increased to over 700—with a number of patrons coming from other parts of Canada, the United States and even the United Kingdom. The guests as well had an enjoyable time. Jeremy Bulloch commented on his website that "The people of Newfoundland are extremely friendly. It was only the second time that Darren had put the 'Sci-Fi on the Rock' show on, and it was very well attended. Lots of costumes and games for the children and it seemed that everyone was having a good time".

Sci-Fi on the Rock II featured a Charity Auction, which benefited the School Lunch Association. Items that had been placed for bid included a Limited Edition Star Wars T-shirt-and-Box Set which is not available in North America (donated by Jeremy Bulloch), a Lexx Prize pack, including many behind-the-scenes cuts and scripts (donated by Brian Downey), a Limited Edition Boba Fett action figure, personally autographed by Jeremy Bulloch, and a P.A.D.D. that was used on the set of Star Trek: The Next Generation (which was donated by an agent of one of the actors of the show).

Sci-Fi on the Rock III 

Sci-Fi on the Rock had its third festival on April 25 and 26, 2009 at the Holiday Inn in St. John's once again. The special guest actors for this year were Vaughn Armstrong, who is perhaps best known as Admiral Maxwell Forrest from Star Trek: Enterprise, Christian Simpson, who notably played Lt. Gavyn Sykes in Star Wars Episode I: The Phantom Menace and also worked on Harry Potter and the Goblet of Fire (as Old Fred Weasley), and Peter Mayhew who notably played Chewbacca the Wookiee in the Star Wars saga. Author guests included returning authors Kenneth Tam, Matthew LeDrew and Willie Meikle, and welcomed for the first time Louise Bohmer.

Following in the tradition of the previous year, the festival was upgraded due to the overwhelming response to the last festival to better accommodate the demand. Such changes included the addition of a third workshop room, which added around 20+ workshops to the festival. Other additions included the Cantina, a midnight movie, and website redesigns. This year also marked the first Fan Film that Sci-Fi on the Rock was involved with producing: Star Wars: Inner Demons.

Returning attractions included many of the workshops from the previous year, including Lightsaber Technique, Stage Combat, Star Wars, Transformers, Special Effect Make-up and others. The Charity Auction also returned, again aiding the School Lunch Association. Dinner with the Stars, an event where a limited number of guests are able to sit and enjoy a three-course meal with the special guest actors, also returned.

Sci-Fi on the Rock 3 was met with over a thousand visitors, and received many positive reviews from patrons.

Sci-Fi on the Rock IV 

Sci-Fi on the Rock IV took place on April 17 and 18, 2010. Planning began in September 2009. The festival took place in its regular venue, the Holiday Inn. Special guests included actors Casey Biggs who played Damar on Star Trek: Deep Space Nine, Max Grodénchik who played Rom on Star Trek: Deep Space Nine and Nalini Krishan who is perhaps best known as Barris Offee, the Jedi Padawan to Lumiara Unduli, as well as authors Matthew LeDrew, Ellen Curtis, Dwain Campbell, Ira Nayman, Kevin Woolridge and Patti Kennedy. Actor Mike Savva was scheduled to attend, but as a result of the Icelandic Volcano eruptions and the resulting ash cloud over UK Airspace, he was unable to come to Newfoundland.

The 2010 festival again broke its previous record by having over 1200 people visit its attractions, beating the previous year's total of just over 1000. This was a twofold success, as this year the festival competed with the 2010 JUNO Awards. Besides growth in numbers, the festival grew in other ways. For example, in May 2009 (almost immediately following the past festival), Sci-Fi on the Rock opened an online store on their website. Also,
Due to the success of Hann Made Film's first fan-film, Star Wars: Inner Demons, Hann Made Films filmed another fan-film, this time a Stargate SG-1/Doctor Who crossover film, titled Replication. The film debuted at Sci-Fi on the Rock IV, to great reception again.

Also, Sci-Fi on the Rock and HannMade Films teamed up to create Sci-Fi on the Rock TV, a video magazine that provided festival updates on an "almost bi-weekly" basis. Season One of Sci-Fi on the Rock TV was hosted by Steve Lake and Ellen Curtis, and ran from September 11, 2009 to May 2010.

Season Two began in September 2010, with both hosts returning, until Ellen Curtis was replaced by Melanie Collins.

Sci-Fi on the Rock V 
Sci-Fi on the Rock held its fifth festival on April 15, 16 and 17, 2011, making this year the first time the organization launched a festival that spanned three days. It was held again at the St. John's Holiday Inn, and was kicked off with a book launch from festival co-founder Darren Hann, followed by the festival's first ever film festival. Special guests who were in attendance this year were actor Mike Savva (who was scheduled to appear for Sci-Fi on the Rock IV but was waylaid due to Volcanic activity over UK airspace), actor Robert Axelrod (better known as the voice of Lord Zedd from the Power Rangers), actor David Nykl, known as Doctor Zelenka from Stargate Atlantis, actor John Garman "J. G." Hertzler (known in the Star Trek community for his role on Star Trek: Deep Space Nine (DS9) as the Klingon General, and later Chancellor, Martok) and Suzie Plakson who is an actress, singer, writer, poet, and artist, who has played four characters on various Star Trek series, including Worf's wife K'Ehleyr. Special guests also included returning authors Matthew Ledrew, Ellen Curtis, and actor/comic creator Kevin Woolridge, and welcomed newcomers Charles Picco from Todd and the Book of Pure Evil.  Picco, a native Newfoundlander, is the co-creator/co-writer/executive story editor of Todd and The Book of Pure Evil, a comedy/horror series that previously aired on the Space Channel.

Like in previous years, the fifth festival beat its numbers from the previous year; while an exact figure is not yet known, it is estimated that around 1500 people visited the festival this year. Because this year marked the organization's fifth year, the festival staff introduced its first annual film festival, which commenced on the festival's opening night. Eleven films were submitted and screened, ten of which were from local film-makers, and one (X-Meeting) from Halifax, Nova Scotia. The winner of this film festival was a horror/comedy short called "Date With The Dead".

Sci-Fi on the Rock VI 
Sci-Fi on the Rock VI occurred on April 20 to 22, 2012. Due to the growth of attendees at Sci-Fi on the Rock events, the layout of the festival underwent and overhaul to ensure the larger numbers could be accommodated. This new layout has continued to stand as the standard. Special guest actor Richard Hatch of Battlestar Galactica fame, in addition to appearing as a guest, offered an acting workshop for festival patrons. Also appearing was Jeffrey Combs from the Reanimator series, Peter Roy who appeared in Star Wars and Doctor Who, French-born Fantasy Art model Drakaina, comedian and chocolate bar inspiration Fat Apollo, and talent agent Lolita Fatjo, who has helped Sci-Fi on the Rock obtain many of their previous and future guests.

The Film Festival returned, featuring 9 short films. This time, the festival went international very unexpectedly, and received submissions from India, Spain, Mexico, Denmark and the United Kingdom. The winner of the JFE Audience Choice Award was a film called "Deadspiel", from Ontario.

Once more, the festival beat its own record for attendees, with the numbers reaching close to 1800.

Sci-Fi on the Rock VII 
Sci-Fi on the Rock held its seventh annual festival from April 24 to April 26, 2013. The special guests for that year included Mike Dopud from Stargate Universe, Dominic Keating from Star Trek: Enterprise, Dean Haglund who portrayed Langly in The X-Files and its spin-off series The Lone Gunmen, Gary Jones who is perhaps best known for playing Walter Harriman on Stargate: SG1, and cosplay model and actress Ginny McQueen.

In the previous year, some of the special guest actors undertook a more active role in the event than simply delivering a Q&A panel and offering photos and autographs (namely, Richard Hatch offered an acting workshop). The same happened this year, as actors Dean Haglund and Gary Jones—who are close friends in real life—served as Masters of Ceremonies for the Sci-Fi on the Rock cantina, as well as closing out the show with a rousing improvised comedy sketch. The remaining special guests were among the entertained audience members, showcasing that the Sci-Fi on the Rock offerings as well as the inherent charm of Newfoundland and Labrador made this event equally as entertaining to the guests themselves as it did to the patrons.

Continuing again with its trend of breaking its own attendance numbers, Sci-Fi on the Rock 7 was met with a staggering increase in popularity.

The Sci-Fi on the Rock International Film Festival entered its third year, and received some of its best submissions. Films were received from Newfoundland, Ontario, Alberta, the United States, Spain and the United Kingdom. The winning film was "Brutal Relax", a Spanish film by film maker David Muñoz.

Sci-Fi on the Rock VIII 
Sci-Fi on the Rock 8 took place at the Holiday Inn in St. John's on May 23, 24 and 25, 2014. Guests included Aron Eisenberg from Star Trek: Deep Space Nine, Michael Hogan from Battlestar Galactica and Teen Wolf, Erin Fitzgerald who voices characters from a wide variety of video games and TV shows including Monster High, Bravely Default and Ed, Edd and Eddy, and Musetta Vander from various sci-fi films and television shows. Also announced to appear is make-up artist Mike McCarty, who is known for his work on Sin City, Kill Bill 1 and 2, The Pacific and The Lion, The Witch and The Wardrobe (which won an Oscar for Best Make-up).

The film festival entered its fourth year at Sci-Fi on the Rock, having its most successful turn-out yet. This year, there were three awards—Best Picture (awarded by judges), Critical Impact (awarded by judges) and Audience Choice Award. The Critical Impact award, which recognizes a film that demonstrates powerful storytelling execution, was awarded to U.S. film Aemorraghe, while Best Picture and Audience Choice Award were both awarded to the short film Fist of Jesus from Barcelona, Spain.

Sci-Fi on the Rock 9 
Sci-Fi on the Rock 9 is took place at the Holiday Inn in St. John's from April 24–26, 2015. Guests include Lynda Boyd from Supernatural, Sanctuary and Republic of Doyle, Frazer Hines who is better known as the Second Doctor's companion Jamie McCrimmon from Doctor Who, Peter Williams who played Apophis on Stargate: SG-1, cosplayers Adam Smith and Kevin St. Pierre, with Fat Apollo returning to Emcee certain events.

The event was again a great success. The crowd was so large that it was clear that Sci-Fi on the Rock had again outgrown a venue. This would be the last year that Sci-Fi on the Rock took place at the Holiday Inn.

Sci-Fi on the Rock 10 
Sci-Fi on the Rock experienced its first big move since 2008. Sci-Fi on the Rock 10 took place at the Sheraton Hotel Newfoundland in St. John's from April 1–3, 2016. Guests included Eugene Simon, from Game of Thrones, Robert Picardo, known as the Doctor on Star Trek: Voyager as well as from shows such as Stargate, Kirby Morrow, a well known voice actor, and J.M. Frey, a writer. As well Fat Apollo came back again to act as emcee.

The location change was very successful. The move gave Sci-Fi on the Rock some room to stretch its legs and attendees appreciated the extra space that the Sheraton Hotel provided. The vendor's area grew and more varied vendors and artists were able to attend. The attendance for SFotR 10 was well over 2250 people throughout the weekend. This was the first year that Sci-Fi on the Rock had a VIP pass.

The change in location also gave Sandbox Gaming a bigger and more comfortable space at our convention for gaming.

Sci-Fi on the Rock 11 
Sci-Fi on the Rock 11 was held at the Sheraton Hotel Newfoundland in St. John's from April 28–30, 2017. Guests included Doug Jones (actor), known from many films and television shows including Hellboy II: The Golden Army, Buffy the Vampire Slayer, Pan's Labyrinth, and Hocus Pocus (1993 film), Jewel Staite, best known as Kaylee on Firefly (TV series) as well as from many television shows and films such as Stargate Atlantis, Higher Ground (TV series), The L.A. Complex, and The Killing (U.S. TV series), Ethan Phillips, an actor best known as Neelix on Star Trek: Voyager, as well as local cosplay guests FoamWerx, Gary Murrin and Hamilton Cornish. Fat Apollo was once again the guest emcee.

Sci-Fi on the Rock saw another amazing year with many great workshops. Space at the Sheraton Hotel is already becoming tight as some workshops and panels had long line-ups and filled to capacity. On Sunday attendees and committee alike were surprised by an unplanned visit to the convention by past guest Eugene Simon, who said that when he realized he had the time he did not want to miss it.

Sci-Fi on the Rock 12 
Sci-Fi on the Rock 12 took place at the Sheraton Hotel Newfoundland on April 6–8, 2018. Guests included actress, ADR director and singer-songwriter Mary Elizabeth McGlynn, voice actor of anime, animation and video games Steven Blum, actor Fintan McKeown, known for Star Trek: Voyager, Merlin (2008 TV series), and Game of Thrones, and Connor Trinneer known for his work on Star Trek: Enterprise and Stargate Atlantis. The cosplay guest was Vanessa Pinsent Cosplay who specializes in big builds using a variety of materials including fabric, foam and more. Returning as Master of Ceremonies was comedian Fat Apollo.

Sci-Fi on the Rock 13 
The successful completion of Sci-Fi on the Rock 13 took place at the Sheraton Hotel Newfoundland on March 29–31, 2019.

Guests included Stefan Kapicic known as Colossus of the Deadpool movies, Terry Farrell known for her role in the Star Trek Deep Space 9  series, Rainbow Francks known for Stargate Atlantis, Aliens vs Predator: Requiem, and Umbrella Academy, Lori White an animator for several well known cartoons, local cosplayer Nichole Maddox of Mad Maddox Cosplay, and Fat Apollo as Master of Ceremonies.

The three day event included workshops and panels created by both the organizational committee as well as members of the community. Back this year by popular demand was the 19+ Dance Party which showed a significant growth in attendance from previous years, as well as the all ages karaoke. This year saw the revival of the live auction, as well as the short film festival this year hosted by the Nickel Independent Film Festival.

Several new events were offered for 2019 including the book launch of "The Fifth Queen" for author Ali House, and a live performance from the CBS band.

Sci-Fi on the Rock 14 
After the Covid-19 pandemic forced the closure of the 2020 and 2021 convention, Sci-Fi on the Rock 14 returned on June 24-26, 2022 at the Sheraton Hotel Newfoundland. 

Guests included: Brennan Mejia the Red Ranger from Power Rangers Dino Charge, Diego Diaz from Corrective Measures and Daniel from The Dead Girls Detective Agency; Nicole de Boer known for playing Joan Leaven cult film Cube, Ezri Dax on the final season of Star Trek: Deep Space Nine and Sarah Bannerman on the series The Dead Zone; local cosplay husband and wife duo Kayla & Tyler Burry of Kay Tea Cosplay; Fat Apollo as Master of Ceremonies and the convention's first ever Youtube Guest The Distorted Theorists. 

The two year hiatus meant there was extra time to make outstanding cosplay creations that wowed the con-goers and made the kids & adult costume contest a popular event. The Distorted Theorists also added an exciting element conducting interviews, live streams, giveaways and announcing the kids costume contest from the hotel's garden court.

Geek Survivor 
Additional to the contests discussed in the main articles, there is a larger competition held during the festival called "Geek Survivor", where contestants compete to be crowned the title of "Newfoundland's Ultra Geek".

Although it is called "Geek Survivor", it more closely resembles Jeopardy! and Beat the Geeks in structure and style. It is a trivia-based game, where contestants answer questions of varying difficulty about different Sci-Fi topics. At the end of the game, the contestant with the highest score is crowned "Ultra Geek".

Mark Downey was crowned as the first Sci-Fi on the Rock Ultra Geek on April 1, 2007. Dr. Glyn George, a MUN professor and Doctor Who and Star Trek enthusiast, was crowned on April 20, 2008. He later abdicated his throne, as he became involved in the planning of Sci-Fi on the Rock, retiring from the competition undefeated. Newfoundland's Ultra Geek for 2009, crowned at Sci-Fi on the Rock 3, was Chickie Who. They, too, retired undefeated.

Andrew O'Brien was crowned as Newfoundland's fourth Ultra Geek on April 18, 2010. Unlike his predecessors, he competed again in the fifth Geek Survivor challenge, but was dethroned by Ford Cooke, who was crowned as the fifth Ultra Geek on April 17, 2011.

In 2012, the winner of Geek Survivor was a patron who was identified only as "Star Wars guy", and 2013 saw the rise of Jason Gosse as Newfoundland's Ultra Geek.

Film Festival
In 2011, Sci-Fi on the Rock teamed up with a local company, to bring forth the festival's first annual film festival as a large-scale addition to the festival attractions. This festival offered the JFE Audience Choice Award, sponsored by Justin Foley Entertainment, which was awarded to the film that received the highest number of audience votes. In its first year, 11 films were submitted and screened, 10 of which were from local film-makers, and one (X-Meeting) from Halifax, Nova Scotia.

In 2015, the film festival separated from Sci-Fi on the Rock due of large interest, and became a stand-alone event called Granite Planet International Film Festival, but still brings highlighted films to be screened at Sci-Fi on the Rock.

A refreshed version of the Film Festival will be returning to Sci-Fi on the Rock in 2018 to be organized by Sci-Fi on the Rock.

Workshops
Apart from the media guest Q&A's, autographs and photo sessions, there are many other workshops during the festival, these change yearly but in the past have included:

 Comic-Book drawing
 Acting
 Getting Published
 Getting Self-Published
 Costume Contests
 Lego Robotics
 Lightsaber Workshop
 Movie Make-up
 Writer's Circle

The Cantina
Making its first appearance at Sci-Fi on the Rock 2009, the Cantina is an informal concert/variety show held on one of the evenings of the festival. Performers opt to play Sci-Fi related music, known as Filk, but that is not always the case. The Cantina features performances by musicians involved with the festival, an open mic, and there is an improvised acting piece prepared that audience members are call upon to perform. The event gets its name as a reference to the Mos Eisley Cantina in Star Wars: A New Hope.

At its maiden performance in 2009, guest Vaughn Armstrong performed at the Cantina with his ukulele, which was a highlight performance. In 2011, Suzie Plakson gave a singing performance, and in 2013 the Cantina was hosted by Gary Jones and Dean Haglund, a first-time occurrence for the Cantina. They also closed out the show with an improvised sketch comedy, which paid a great deal of attention to the name of one of Newfoundland and Labrador's communities, Dildo. The Cantina was replaced with Friday Night Karaoke in 2015.

The Dance
Sci-Fi on the Rock holds a dance on the Saturday of the convention. This is a 19+ event held at the hotel the convention is being held in. It is a very popular event that draws quiet a crowd.

Starlight/VIP Social
The Starlight Social started as an add-on event that included champagne and possibly meeting guests. After the introduction of the VIP Pass in 2015 it became a VIP only event. Dessert buffet or finger food platters have been provided in previous years, and it is a chance to socialize in a smaller setting than the dance or karaoke.

In 2018 the Starlight Social also included a live musical accompaniment by the Newfoundland Symphony Orchestra.

Guest history
Since its inception, Sci-Fi on the Rock has had a number of guests of different types. Below is a list of guests they have had at their festival.

2007
 Kenneth Tam, author
 Shannon Patrick Sullivan, author
 Vader Party, business/cosplayers

2008
 Kenneth Tam, author
 William Meikle, author
 Matthew LeDrew, author
 Paul Tucker, comic book artist
 Jeremy Bulloch, actor
 Brian Downey, actor

2009
 Kenneth Tam, author
 Matthew LeDrew, author
 Willie Meikle, author
 Louise Bohmer, author
 Vaughn Armstrong, actor
 Christian Simpson, actor
 Peter Mayhew, actor

2010
 Nalini Krishan, actress
 Casey Biggs, actor
 Max Grodénchik, actor
 Matthew LeDrew, author
 Ellen Curtis, author
 Dwain Campbell, author
 Ira Nayman, author
 Kevin Woolridge, comic book creator

2011
 Mike Savva, actor
 Robert Axelrod, actor
 David Nykl, actor
 Suzie Plakson, actress
 J. G. Hertzler, actor
 Ellen Curtis, author
 Matthew LeDrew, author
 Kevin Woolridge, author/comic artist
 Charles Picco, co-creator/co-writer/executive story editor of Todd and the Book of Pure Evil

2012
 Richard Hatch, actor
 Jeffrey Combs, actor
 Lolita Fatjo, writer and agent
 Peter Roy, actor
 Fat Apollo, comedian
 Drakaina, fantasy art model

2013
 Dominic Keating, actor
 Mike Dopud, actor
 Gary Jones, actor
 Dean Haglund, actor
 Ginny McQueen, Cosplay model/actress

2014
 Michael Hogan, actor
 Aron Eisenberg, actor
 Musetta Vander, actress
 Mike McCarty, make up artist/author
 Erin Fitzgerald, voice actor

2015
 Lynda Boyd, actress
 Frazer Hines, actor
 Peter Williams, actor
 Adam Smith and Kevin St. Pierre, cosplayers
 Fat Apollo, emcee

2016
 Eugene Simon, actor
 Kirby Morrow, actor/voice actor
 Robert Picardo, actor
 J.M. Frey, author
 Fat Apollo, emcee

2017
 Jewel Staite, actress
 Doug Jones, actor/ voice actor
 Ethan Phillips, actor/ voice actor
 Foamwerx - Gary Murrin and Hamilton Cornish, local cosplay guests
 Fat Apollo, emcee

2018
 Fintan McKeown actor
 Steven Blum voice actor
 Mary Elizabeth McGlynn voice actor, singer
 Vanessa Pincent Cosplay - Vanessa Pincent
 Fat Apollo, Emcee

2019
 Stefan Kapicic, actor
 Terry Farrell, actress
 Rainbow Francks, actor
 Lori White, animator
 Mad Maddox Cosplay - Nicole Maddox, Cosplayer 
 Fat Apollo, emcee

Outside Events 
The Sci-Fi on the Rock committee spends the rest of the time they are not planning the convention going to outside events. Often these events invite the public to join them in doing different things.

Some events that Sci-Fi on the Rock has hosted or attended in the past include:

Hosted 
 24 Hour Dungeons and Dragons Marathon lived streamed on Twitch for Charity
 BBQ in the park
 Clothing Swaps
 Cosplay Workshops
 Trivia Nights
 Merry Geek-mas (more below)
 Sci-Fi at the Rocket

Attended 
 Pride Parade 
 St. John's Christmas Parade
 Mount Pearl Christmas Parade
 Avalon Expo
 Hal-Con
 NGX by Sandbox Gaming
 The St. John's Regatta
 Victoria Park Lantern Fest

Merry Geek-mas 
Merry Geek-mas is a craft fair hosted by Sci-Fi on the Rock around the end of November or beginning of December each year. Vendors that frequently attend Sci-Fi on the Rock as well as other vendors with similarly geeky products are given space to sell their wares in time for the holiday season. Table space is also given to the charity Sci-fi on the Rock is supporting for the year. In previous years a canteen was open with food such as chili for purchase.

Costumed characters attend and were available for photo ops in previous years, and have included Superheroes, Princesses, and a unique Santa-Vader experience!

The event is taking place at the Mazol Shriner's in St. John's Newfoundland in December 2019.

Sci-Fi at the Rocket 
Since 2015 Sci-Fi on the Rock has been partnering with the Rocket Bakery, in downtown St. John's, to host a kick-off event for Sci-Fi on the Rock each year. This event is typically held the weekend before Sci-Fi on the Rock and has mini workshops and panels as well as Sandbox Gaming with some games. In the past there has been trivia, author readings, auctions and more.

Sci-Fi on the Rock TV
In September 2009, Sci-Fi on the Rock put together "Sci-Fi on the Rock TV", a webshow that would appear on YouTube and Facebook, as well as on the Sci-Fi on the Rock website. Each "webisode" runs approximately 10 minutes in length, and would serve as publicity for the festival, as well as a video newsletter, as it were. It is hosted by Steve Lake and Ellen Curtis, and is directed and produced by Darren Hann. The first episode "aired" on YouTube and Facebook on Friday, September 11, 2009. The guests were Darren Hann (Sci-Fi on the Rock festival organizer) and Matthew LeDrew (author of the Black Womb series).

Season One Episodes
Episode 1—September 11, 2009. Guests: Darren Hann, Matthew LeDrew
Episode 2—September 18, 2009. Guests: Jennifer Graham, Ross Barney
Episode 3—October 12, 2009. Guests: Justin Foley, Simon Babineau
Episode 4—November 6, 2009. Guests: Melanie Collins, Carson Smith, Matthew LeDrew (Note: This was a special "Roadshow" episode, where Sci-Fi on the Rock TV visit Newfoundland's West Coast Con in Corner Brook)
Episode 5—December 12, 2009. Guests: Justin Foley, Peggy Dixon
Episode 6—January 27, 2010. Guests: Melanie Collins, Mark Todd
Episode 7—February 21, 2010. Guests: Darth Vader, Darren Hann
Episode 8—March 22, 2010. Guests: Jean Hewson, Julia Coombes
Episode 9—April 6, 2010. Festival Recap episode.

Sci-Fi on the Rock TV plans to air some "on-location" episodes from the Sci-Fi festival.

Season Two Episodes
Season Two of Sci-Fi on the Rock TV saw the return of Steve Lake and Ellen Curtis as hosts, but also Ellen's departure and the addition of Melanie Collins as co-host. Also, Season Two was filmed in a new location, with new equipment and new opening sequences. It is available to be watched at the Sci-Fi on the Rock site.

References

External links
 Sci-Fi on the Rock Official site
 Telegram News

Science fiction conventions in Canada
Multigenre conventions
2007 establishments in Canada